Arnold A. Offner (born September 6, 1937, Brooklyn) is an American historian, and Cornelia F. Hugel Professor of History Emeritus at Lafayette College. He is a past president of the Society for Historians of American Foreign Relations.

Life 
Offner grew up in Brooklyn, New York. He earned a B.A. from Columbia University in 1959, and an M.A. in 1960 and Ph.D in 1964 from Indiana University. He taught at Syracuse University, Boston University, and Lafayette College. He has won numerous awards for his scholarship and teaching. He resides in Newton, Massachusetts, with his wife, Ellen.

Works 

 Another Such Victory: President Truman and the Cold War, 1945-1953 Stanford, CA: Stanford University Press, 2002. , 
 The Origins of the Second World War: American Foreign Policy and World Politics, 1917-1941, New York: Praeger Publishers, 1973. , 
 American Appeasement: United States Foreign Policy and Germany, 1933-1938, Cambridge, MA: Belknap Press of Harvard University Press, 1965; New York: W.W. Norton, 1996. , 
 Hubert Humphrey: The Conscience of the Country Yale University Press, 2018. , 
“How the South Made Hubert Humphrey Care About Race,”

References

External links 
 Official website

Living people
Historians from New York (state)
1937 births
Columbia College (New York) alumni
Indiana University alumni
Lafayette College faculty
Syracuse University faculty
Boston University faculty
People from Brooklyn
People from Newton, Massachusetts